List of Israeli artists may refer to:
 List of Israeli musical artists
 List of Israeli visual artists